Lophocorona astiptica is a species of moth of the family Lophocoronidae. It was described by Ian Francis Bell Common in 1973, and is endemic to Western Australia.

References 

Moths described in 1973
Moths of Australia
Arthropods of Western Australia
Lophocoronoidea